Potasimto (fl. 592 BCE) was an ancient Egyptian general during the 26th Dynasty.

Biography
Born in Pharbaetus, he was the commander of the Greek and Carian troops which were sent by pharaoh Psamtik II, along with Egyptian troops, in the military expedition against Nubia in 592 BCE. The name Potasimto was given to him by those foreign soldiers and is indeed a Hellenization of the Egyptian name  (or Padisematawy). The hellenized form of the name came from a well-known Greek graffito which was scratched by his troops on the left leg of the colossal seated statue of Ramesses II in Abu Simbel:

Potasimto died some time after the successful campaign, and was probably buried in Kom Abu Yassin (the necropolis of Pharbaetus) as evidenced by his monuments. These include a stone sarcophagus and a stone vessel now both at the Cairo Museum, three ushabti (Limoges, Annecy and Bologna), a statue of his father Raemmaakheru and a stela of his brother.

References

Further reading

6th-century BC Egyptian people
Ancient Egyptian soldiers
People of the Twenty-sixth Dynasty of Egypt
7th-century BC births
6th-century BC deaths
Abu Simbel